Robertshaw is an English surname. Notable people with the surname include:

Andrew Robertshaw, English historian
Calvin Robertshaw, guitarist of British doom metal band My Dying Bride
Chris Robertshaw, Manx politician
Freda Robertshaw (1916–1997), Australian artist
Fredrick W. Robertshaw (1858–1941), English-American inventor and industrialist - invented the thermostat
Jeff Robertshaw (born 1983), Canadian football player
Jerrold Robertshaw (1866–1941), English actor
Kate Robertshaw (born 1990), English badminton player
Louis Robertshaw (1912–2003), American football player and United States Marine Corps general
Rawson Robertshaw (1861–1920), English rugby union player

English-language surnames